Le Tigre aime la chair fraîche ("The Tiger loves fresh meat"), English title Code Name: Tiger, is a 1964 French Eurospy film directed by Claude Chabrol and starring Roger Hanin as the spy Louis Rapière, code named "The Tiger". The screenplay was written by Chabrol and Hanin. It was an attempt to create a French franchise equal to James Bond, and its female lead, Daniela Bianchi, had the previous year appeared in the James Bond film From Russia with Love. The film had a sequel in 1965, Le tigre se parfume à la dynamite (Our Agent Tiger).

Plot
The French government plans an international arms deal with the help of a Turkish diplomate named Baskine. But a group of terrorists menaces the diplomat. When the government receives intelligence concerning a looming attempt on Baskine's life, they assign Louis Rapière  "The Tiger" to guard Baskine and his family. Rapière immediately proves this decision right by scarcely foiling an assassination. Unfortunately more than one group is after Baskine. They are closing in on Baskine independently from each other.

Cast
Roger Hanin as Louis Rapière a.k.a. 'le Tigre'
Maria Mauban as Madame Baskine
Daniela Bianchi as Mehlica Baskine
Roger Dumas as Duvet
Antonio Passalia as Coubassi
Jimmy Karoubi as Jean-Luc
Roger Rudel as Benita
Carlo Nell as the assassin in the theatre

Crew
Josée Dayan was the assistant director on the movie.

Bibliography

References

External links

1964 films
1960s spy thriller films
Films directed by Claude Chabrol
French spy thriller films
Parody films based on James Bond films
1960s French films